Matthew John Fitzsimmons (born 10 December 1913, date of death unknown) was an English footballer who played as a centre half for Liverpool, Mather United and Ipswich Town. He also featured for York City as a wartime guest. He was born in Toxteth, Liverpool.

References

External links
 LFC History profile

1913 births
Year of death unknown
People from Toxteth
Footballers from Liverpool
English footballers
Association football central defenders
Liverpool F.C. players
Ipswich Town F.C. players
English Football League players
York City F.C. wartime guest players